The 1986 Sonoma State Cossacks football team represented Sonoma State University as a member of the Northern California Athletic Conference (NCAC) during the 1986 NCAA Division II football season. Led by Tony Kehl in his fifth and final season as head coach, Sonoma State compiled an overall record of 4–6 with a mark of 2–3 in conference play, placing fourth in the NCAC. The team was outscored by its opponents 235 to 199 for the season. The Cossacks played home games at Cossacks Stadium in Rohnert Park, California.

Kehl finished his tenure at Sonoma State with an overall record of 13–39, for a .250 winning percentage.

Schedule

Notes

References

Sonoma State
Sonoma State Cossacks football seasons
Sonoma State Cossacks football